The 1978–79 Czechoslovak Extraliga season was the 36th season of the Czechoslovak Extraliga, the top level of ice hockey in Czechoslovakia. 12 teams participated in the league, and Slovan CHZJD Bratislava won the championship.

Regular season

1. Liga-Qualification 

 Škoda Plzeň – Spartak Dubnica nad Váhom 3:1 (2:4, 6:1, 6:3, 6:0)

External links
History of Czechoslovak ice hockey

Czechoslovak Extraliga seasons
Czech
1978–79 in Czechoslovak ice hockey